Kent is an unincorporated community in Sherman County, Oregon, United States.  Kent has a post office with a ZIP code 97033.  Kent lies at the intersection of U.S. Route 97 and Dobie Point Road, between Grass Valley to the north and Shaniko to the south.

Kent was the site of a railway station, originally called Guthrie, on the Columbia Southern Railway. The name of the community stemmed from a drawing from a group of names submitted by local residents that was drawn out of a hat by Kent's first postmaster, according to the original residents. Milton H. Bennett was that postmaster, who ran the post office beginning in about 1887. The name was suggested because it was short and easy to write.

Climate
This region experiences warm (but not hot) and dry summers, with no average monthly temperatures above .  According to the Köppen Climate Classification system, Kent has a steppe climate, abbreviated "BSk" on climate maps.

See also
Jack Knife Fire

References

Unincorporated communities in Sherman County, Oregon
Unincorporated communities in Oregon
Ghost towns in Oregon